Michael Berry may refer to:

 Michael Berry (athlete) (born 1991), American sprinter
 Michael Berry (physicist) (born 1941), British mathematical physicist
 Michael Berry (radio host) (born 1970), American talk show host
 Michael Berry, Baron Hartwell (1911–2001), newspaper proprietor and journalist
 Michael Berry Jr. (born 1964), British actor
 Mike Berry (singer) (born 1942), English singer and actor
Mike "Cannonball" Berry (born 1911), American Negro league baseball player

See also
 Mike O'Berry (born 1954), former catcher in Major League Baseball
 Michael Barry (disambiguation)